Kuany Ngor Kuany (born 8 July 1994) is a South Sudanese-Australian basketball player who last played for Kauhajoen Karhu of the Finnish League and FIBA Europe Cup.

Professional career
Born in Aweil, South Sudan, Kuany moved to Melbourne, Australia at age 9. Kuany started his professional career in 2017 with the Cairns Taipans of the NBL. He stayed there for two seasons. On 20 December 2018, Kuany had a career-high 10 points in a home loss to the Sydney Kings. In the 2018–19 season, Kuany played with the Ballarat Miners in the NBL1. There, he averaged 17.7 points, 5.5 rebounds and 2.2 assists per game.

On 15 September 2019, Kuany signed with the Sydney Kings. On 27 November, he was delisted from the roster by the Kings after the team acquired Xavier Cooks.

In 2021, Kuany returned to the NBL1 to play with the Sandringham Sabres, where he averaged 20.2 points per game in 12 games.

In September, 2021, Kuany signed for Vrijednosnice Osijek of the Croatian League and the ABA League Second Division.

National team career
Kuany has played for the South Sudan national basketball team. At AfroBasket 2021, he contributed 11.8 points and 5.5 rebounds as a starter, helping the team reach the quarterfinals in its first major tournament.

References

External links
Kuany Kuany at Proballers
Kuany Ngor Kuany at RealGM

1994 births
Living people
Australian expatriate basketball people in the United States
Australian men's basketball players
Ballarat Miners players
Cairns Taipans players
Chaminade Silverswords men's basketball players
Kauhajoen Karhu players
KK Vrijednosnice Osijek players
Sandringham Sabres players
Shooting guards
South Sudanese men's basketball players
Sydney Kings players